Peium or Peion, also known as Peon, was a fortress of the Tolistoboii in ancient Galatia, where Deiotarus kept his treasures.

Its site is located near Tabanlıoğlu Kale, Asiatic Turkey.

References

Populated places in ancient Galatia
Former populated places in Turkey
Populated places of the Byzantine Empire
Roman towns and cities in Turkey
History of Ankara Province